is the second single by Mayu Watanabe, released in Japan on July 5, 2012.

Release 
On July 19, Watanabe announced the release of her second single, "Otona Jellybeans" (translated "Adult Jelly Beans"), for July 25. She described the single as her type of song.  Regarding the album cover, where she does not wear her trademark pigtails, she says she "tried to show my natural and mature side. It was fresh and fun." 
The single was released in four versions: Limited Edition A, Limited Edition B, Limited Edition C, and Regular Edition.

Reception
The single reached number three on the Oricon weekly chart. It was also certified gold by RIAJ.

Track listing

Regular Edition

Limited Edition A

Limited Edition B

Limited Edition C

Charts

References

External links 
 Mayu Watanabe's discography
 

2012 singles
Songs with lyrics by Yasushi Akimoto
Mayu Watanabe songs
Sony Music Entertainment Japan singles
2012 songs